Casio fx-3650P is a programmable scientific calculator manufactured by Casio Computer Co., Ltd. It can store 12 digits for the mantissa and 2 digits for the exponent together with the expression each time when the "EXE" button is pressed. Also, the calculator can use the previous result to do calculations by pressing "Ans" (if calculator didn't turned off itself, by auto-power-off function, or by user). It is one of the calculators approved by HKEAA to be used in public examinations in Hong Kong, such as HKDSE.

Modes 

The calculator is available in 6 modes:

 Basic arithmetic calculations
 Complex number calculations
 Standard deviation calculations
 Regression calculations
 Base-n calculations
 Programs

Basic arithmetic calculations 

 Arithmetic calculations
 Fraction operations
 Fraction calculations
 Decimal↔fraction conversions
 Mixed fraction↔improper fraction conversions
 Percentage calculations
 Degrees, minutes, seconds calculations
 Rounding (must be used with Fix decimal display mode)
 Trigonometric functions
 Hyperbolic function
 Logarithm
 Natural logarithm
 Antilogarithm
 Differential calculus
 Integral calculus

Complex number calculations 

In this mode, if the result has both real and imaginary parts, an "R↔I" symbol will appear at the top right corner.

 Absolute value and argument calculations
 Rectangular↔polar form display
 Conjugate calculations

Standard deviation calculations 

This mode is for statistical calculation. For some input data, the sum of squares of values (Σx2), sum of values (Σx), number of data (n), sample standard deviation (xσn-1) and population standard deviation (xσn) can be calculated.

Regression calculations 

This mode is for statistical calculation and can be divided further into:

 Linear regression: y=A+Bx
 Logarithmic regression: y=A+B*ln x
 Exponential regression: ln y=ln A+Bx
 Power regression: y=A+xB
 Inverse regression: y=A+B/x
 Quadratic regression: y=A+Bx+Cx2

For some input ordered pairs, one of the below can be calculated. (The availability differs from modes.)

Σx2, Σx, n, Σy2, Σy, Σxy, xσn, xσn-1, yσn, yσn-1, Regression coefficient A, Regression coefficient B, Correlation coefficient r, Σx3, Σx2y, Σx4, Regression coefficient C, 1and 2

Program 

The calculator can hold up to 4 programs with a total capacity of 360 bytes.

Program commands:

 ? - Operator input command, used when user's input is required. Usually used with →(variable)
 → - Assign to variable command, to assign the value before it to the variable after it. Always used as (value)→(variable).
 : - Multi-statement separator, separate program statements
 ◢ - Output command, output the value
  - Conditional jump, jump when conditions are met
 = - Relational operator
 ≠ - Relational operator
 > - Relational operator
  - Relational operator
 Goto - Unconditional jump, jump to label, otherwise Lbl
 Lbl - Label, jump destination

Conditional jumps 

Conditional jumps should be used in the syntax:
conditionstatement 1:statement 2
When condition is true, statement 1 is executed, then statement 2 is executed. If condition is false, statement 1 is skipped and statement 2 is executed.

E.g.:
...A=0A+1→B:C+5→D:...
If A=0, both A+1→B and C+5→D is executed. If A≠0, only C+5→D is executed.

Unconditional jumps 

Unconditional jumps use Goto and Lbl to operate.

When Goto n (where n is an integer in 0-9) is executed, the program will jump to Lbl n. Loops can be created with unconditional jumps.

System check 

The calculator will perform a system check when shift, 7 and ON are pressed together. The system check has 3 parts.

Part 1: Elements check - All display elements are turned on when the system check is initiated. Pressing [SHIFT] turns the elements off. Press [SHIFT] to proceed. The next 2 screens have similar functions.

Part 2: display check - The dot matrix screen will display "24      PRG13" and the LCD screen will display "0000000000 00". Press shift to proceed. Then the display becomes "BBBBBBBBBB" and "1111111111 11". Then "CCCCCCCCCC" and "222222222 22" and so on up till "JJJJJJJJJJ""9999999999 99". Press shift to proceed to part 3.

Part 3: key check - Press shift, the LCD will display 1. Press alpha, up, down, left, right in order. The display will increase by 1 each time you press a button. Next, press MODE, prog, dx, x−1, x3, and so on up till Ans. When EXE is pressed, the display becomes "24      OK""13" (The display differs from version, the above is for version 4 of the calculator which is the latest version). Press ON to end the system check.

References 

fx-3650P
Products introduced in 2002